The 2003 Molson Indy Montreal was the fourteenth round of the 2003 CART World Series season, held on August 24, 2003 at the Circuit Gilles Villeneuve in Montreal, Quebec, Canada. Michel Jourdain, Jr won his 2nd and final Champ Car victory.

This marks the Final Champ Car race for Max Papis

Qualifying results

Race

Caution flags

Notes 

 New Race Record Michel Jourdain Jr. 1:54:23.210
 Average Speed 106.573 mph

External links
 Full Weekend Times & Results

Montreal
Molson Indy Montreal
Grand Prix of Montreal
2003 in Quebec